The British television soap opera Crossroads had its original run from 1964 to 1988. A later revival ran from 2001 to 2003. It featured a wide range of characters. The only character to persist throughout the whole twenty-four years was Jill Richardson, played by Jane Rossington, although Diane Lawton (Susan Hanson) was present in most of the run.

Characters: Original

Characters: Revival

External links
 

Crossroads (British TV series)